Clarke Hinkle Field is one of the two outdoor American football practice facilities of the Green Bay Packers (the other being Ray Nitschke Field).  These fields, together with the Don Hutson Center, comprise the team's training complex.

The field is named for Clarke Hinkle, who played for the Packers from 1932 to 1941.  Hinkle is a member of both the Pro Football and Packers halls of fame.  The field itself has been in use by the team since 1958, and was named for the former player in 1997.

Clarke Hinkle Field has a sand-based natural turf surface, installed in 2005.  The natural grass surface is reinforced with artificial fibers using the Desso GrassMaster system.  It was installed at Clarke Hinkle Field as a test for the turf problems that plagued Lambeau Field in the later months of the season which proved successful, as Lambeau Field itself was sodded with the Desso GrassMaster system in 2007. The nearby outdoor Ray Nitschke Field has an artificial FieldTurf surface, allowing the team to practice on surfaces used by the majority of NFL teams.

References

Green Bay Packers stadiums
Sports venues in Green Bay, Wisconsin
American football venues in Wisconsin
1958 establishments in Wisconsin
Sports venues completed in 1958